Aldo Alberto Valentini González (25 November 1938 – 25 October 2009) was a Chilean football defender who played for Chile in the 1966 FIFA World Cup. He also played for Colo-Colo.

References

External links
FIFA profile
Football.com profile

1938 births
2009 deaths
Chilean footballers
Chile international footballers
Association football defenders
Colo-Colo footballers
1966 FIFA World Cup players
Chilean people of Italian descent